Performativity is the concept that language can function as a form of social action and have the effect of change. The concept has multiple applications in diverse fields such as anthropology, social and cultural geography, economics, gender studies (social construction of gender), law,  linguistics,  performance studies, history, management studies and philosophy.

The concept is first described by philosopher of language John L. Austin when he referred to a specific capacity: the capacity of speech and communication to act or to consummate an action. Austin differentiated this from constative language, which he defined as descriptive language that can be "evaluated as true or false". Common examples of performative language are making promises, betting, performing a wedding ceremony, an umpire calling a strike, or a judge pronouncing a verdict.

Influenced by Austin, philosopher and gender theorist Judith Butler argued that gender is socially constructed through commonplace speech acts and nonverbal communication that are performative, in that they serve to define and maintain identities. This view of performativity reverses the idea that a person's identity is the source of their secondary actions (speech, gestures). Instead, it views actions, behaviors, and gestures as both the result of an individual's identity as well as a source that contributes to the formation of one's identity which is continuously being redefined through speech acts and symbolic communication. This view was also influenced by philosophers such as Michel Foucault and Louis Althusser.

History

J. L. Austin

The term derives from the founding work in speech act theory by ordinary language philosopher J. L. Austin. In the 1950s, Austin gave the name performative utterances to situations where saying something was doing something, rather than simply reporting on or describing reality. The paradigmatic case here is speaking the words "I do". Austin did not use the word performativity.

Breaking with analytic philosophy, Austin argued in How to Do Things With Words that a "performative utterance" cannot be said to be either true or false as a constative utterance might be: it can only be judged either "happy" or "infelicitous" depending upon whether the conditions required for its success have been met. In this sense, performativity is a function of the pragmatics of language. Having shown that all utterances perform actions, even apparently constative ones, Austin famously discarded the distinction between "performative" and "constative" utterances halfway through the lecture series that became the book and replaced it with a three-level framework:

 locution (the actual words spoken, that which the linguists and linguistic philosophers of the day were mostly interested in analyzing) 
 illocutionary force (what the speaker is attempting to do in uttering the locution) 
 perlocutionary effect (the actual effect the speaker actually has on the interlocutor by uttering the locution)

For example, if a speech act is an attempt to distract someone, the illocutionary force is the attempt to distract and the perlocutionary effect is the actual distraction caused by the speech act in the interlocutor.

Influence of Austin 
Austin's account of performativity has been subject to extensive discussion in philosophy, literature, and beyond. Jacques Derrida, Shoshana Felman, Judith Butler, and Eve Kosofsky Sedgwick are among the scholars who have elaborated upon and contested aspects of Austin's account from the vantage point of deconstruction, psychoanalysis, feminism, and queer theory. Particularly in the work of feminists and queer theorists, performativity has played an important role in discussions of social change (Oliver 2003).

The concept of performativity has also been used in science and technology studies and in economic sociology. Andrew Pickering has proposed to shift from a "representational idiom" to a "performative idiom" in the study of science. Michel Callon has proposed to study the performative aspects of economics, i.e. the extent to which economic science plays an important role not only in describing markets and economies, but also in framing them. Karen Barad has argued that science and technology studies deemphasize the performativity of language in order to explore the performativity of matter (Barad 2003).

Other uses of the notion of performativity in the social sciences include the daily behavior (or performance) of individuals based on social norms or habits. Philosopher and feminist theorist Judith Butler has used the concept of performativity in her analysis of gender development, as well as in her analysis of political speech. Eve Kosofsky Sedgwick describes queer performativity as an ongoing project for transforming the way we may define—and break—boundaries to identity. Through her suggestion that shame is a potentially performative and transformational emotion, Sedgwick has also linked queer performativity to affect theory. Also innovative in Sedgwick's discussion of the performative is what she calls periperformativity (2003: 67–91), which is effectively the group contribution to the success or failure of a speech act.

Judith Butler 

Philosopher and feminist theorist Judith Butler offered a new, more Continental (specifically, Foucauldian) reading of the notion of performativity, which has its roots in linguistics and philosophy of language. They describe performativity as "that reiterative power of discourse to produce the phenomena that it regulates and constrains." They have largely used this concept in their analysis of gender development.

The concept places emphasis on the manners by which identity is passed or brought to life through discourse.  Performative acts are types of authoritative speech. This can only happen and be enforced through the law or norms of the society. These statements, just by speaking them, carry out a certain action and exhibit a certain level of power. Examples of these types of statements are declarations of ownership, baptisms, inaugurations, and legal sentences. Something that is key to performativity is repetition. The statements are not singular in nature or use and must be used consistently in order to exert power (Hall 2000).

Performance theory and gender perspectives 

Butler explains gender as an act. An act that people come to perform in the mode of belief which has been rehearsed much like a script. It is further asserted that people make a reality through repetition (just as actors who make a script). Butler sees gender not as an expression of what one is, rather as something that one does.  Furthermore, they see it not as a social imposition on a gender neutral body, but rather as a mode of "self-making" through which subjects become socially intelligible.  According to Butler's theory, homosexuality and heterosexuality are not fixed categories.  For Butler, a person is merely in a condition of "doing straightness" or "doing queerness" (Lloyd, 1999).

"For Butler, the distinction between the personal and the political or between private and public is itself a fiction designed to support an oppressive status quo: our most personal acts are, in fact, continually being scripted by hegemonic social conventions and ideologies" (Felluga, 2006).

Theoretical criticisms 

Several criticisms have been raised regarding Butler's concept of performativity. The first is that the theory is individual in nature and does not take into consideration such factors as the space within which the performance occurs, the others involved, and how others might see or interpret what they witness.  Also overlooked are the unplanned effects of the performance act and the contingencies surrounding it (Lloyd, 1999).

Another criticism is that Butler is not clear about the concept of subject.  It has been said that in Butler's writings, the subject sometimes only exists tentatively, sometimes possesses a "real" existence, and other times is socially active.  Also, some observe that the theory might be better suited to literary analysis as opposed to social theory. (Brickell, 2005)

Others criticize Butler for taking ethnomethodological and symbolic interactionist sociological analyses of gender and merely reinventing them in the concept of performativity (Dunn 1997; Green 2007).  For example, Green (2007) argues that the work of Kessler and McKenna (1978) and West and Zimmerman (1987) builds directly from Garfinkel (1967) and Goffman (1959) to deconstruct gender into moments of attribution and iteration in a continual social process of "doing" masculinity and femininity in the performative interval.  These latter works are premised on the notion that gender does not precede but, rather, follows from practice, instantiated in micro-interaction. Butler builds off of this notion of gender's constructed nature to enhance the frames of analysis for recognizing and understanding marginalized and oppressed identities and groups.

Jean-François Lyotard 
In The Postmodern Condition: A Report on Knowledge (1979, English translation 1986), philosopher and cultural theorist Jean-François Lyotard defined performativity as the defining mode of legitimation of postmodern knowledge and social bonds, that is, power. In contrast to the legitimation of modern knowledge through such grand narratives as Progress, Revolution, and Liberation, performativity operates by system optimization or the calculation of input and outputs. In a footnote, Lyotard aligns performativity with Austin's concept of performative speech act. Postmodern knowledge must not only report: it must do something and do it efficiently by maximizing input/output ratios.

Lyotard uses Wittgenstein's notion of language games to theorize how performativity governs the articulation, funding, and conduct of contemporary research and education, arguing that at bottom it involves the threat of terror: "be operational (that is commensurable) or disappear" (xxiv). While Lyotard is highly critical of performativity, he notes that it calls on researchers to explain not only the worth of their work but also the worth of that worth.

Lyotard associated performativity with the rise of digital computers in the post-World War II period. In Postwar: A History of Europe Since 1945, historian Tony Judt cites Lyotard to argue that the Left has largely abandoned revolutionary politics for human rights advocacy. The widespread adoption of performance reviews, organizational assessments, and learning outcomes by different social institutions worldwide has led social researchers to theorize "audit culture" and "global performativity".

Against performativity and Jurgen Habermas' call for consensus, Lyotard argued for legitimation by paralogy, or the destabilizing, often paradoxical, introduction of difference into language games.

Jacques Derrida 
Philosopher Jacques Derrida drew on Austin's theory of performative speech act while deconstructing its logocentric and phonocentric premises and reinscribing it within the operations of generalized writing. In contrast to structuralism's focus on linguistic form, Austin had introduced the force of speech acts, which Derrida aligns with Nietzsche's insights on language.

In "Signature, Event, Context," Derrida focused on Austin's privileging of speech and the accompanying presumptions of the presence of a speaker ("signature") and the bounding of a performative's force by an act or a context. In a passage that would become a touchstone of poststructuralist thought, Derrida stresses the citationality or iterability of any and all signs.Every sign, linguistic or nonlinguistic, spoken or written (in the current sense of this opposition), in a small or large unit, can be cited, put between quotation marks; in doing so it can break with every given context, engendering an infinity of new contexts in a manner which is absolutely illimitable. This does not imply that the mark is valid outside of a context, but on the contrary that there are only contexts without any center or absolute anchorage [ancrage]. This citationality, this duplication or duplicity, this iterability of the mark is neither an accident nor an anomaly, it is that (normal/abnormal) without which a mark could not even have a function called "normal." What would a mark be that could not be cited? Or one whose origins would not get lost along the way?Derrida's stress on the citational dimension of performativity would be taken up by Judith Butler and other theorists. While he addressed the performativity of individual subject formation, Derrida also raised such questions as whether we can mark when the event of the Russian revolution went awry, thus scaling up the field of performativity to historical dimensions.

John Searle's reformulation
In A Taxonomy of Illocutionary Acts, John Searle takes up and reformulates the ideas of his colleague J. L. Austin. Though Searle largely supports and agrees with Austin's theory of speech acts, he has a number of critiques, which he outlines: "In sum, there are (at least) six related difficulties with Austin's taxonomy; in ascending order of importance: there is a persistent confusion between verbs and acts, not all the verbs are illocutionary verbs, there is too much overlap of the categories, too much heterogeneity within the categories, many of the verbs listed in the categories don't satisfy the definition given for the category and, most important, there is no consistent principle of classification."

His last key departure from Austin lies in Searle's claim that four of his universal 'acts' do not need 'extra-linguistic' contexts to succeed. As opposed to Austin who thinks all illocutionary acts need extra-linguistic institutions, Searle disregards the necessity of context and replaces it with the "rules of language".

Various applications

Economics and finance 
In economics, the "performativity thesis" is the claim that the assumptions and models used by professionals and popularizers affect the phenomena they purport to describe; bringing the world more into line with theory. This theory was developed by Michel Callon in The Laws of the Markets, before being further developed in Do Economists Make Markets edited by Donald Angus MacKenzie, Fabian Muniesa and Lucia Siu, and in Enacting Dismal Science edited by Ivan Boldyrev and Ekaterina Svetlova. The most important work in the field is that of Donald MacKenzie and Yuval Millo on the social construction of financial markets. In a seminal article, they showed that the option pricing theory called BSM (Black-Scholes-Merton) has been successful empirically not because of the discovery of preexisting price regularities, but because participants used it to set option prices, so that it made itself true.

The thesis of performativity of economics has been extensively criticized by Nicolas Brisset in Economics and Performativity. Brisset defends the idea that the notion of performativity used by Callonian and Latourian sociologists leads to an overly relativistic view of the social world. Drawing on the work of John Austin and David Lewis, Brisset theorizes the idea of limits to performativity. To do this, Brisset considers that a theory, in order to be "performative", must become a convention. This requires conditions to be met. To take a convention status, a theory will have to:

 Provide social actors with a representation of their social world allowing them to choose among several actions ("Empiricity" condition);
 Indicate an option considered relevant when the agreement is generalised ("Self-fulfilling" condition);
 Be compatible with all the conventions constituting the social environment ("Coherency" condition);

Based on this framework, Brisset criticized the seminal work of MacKenzie and Millo on the performativity of the Black-Scholes-Merton financial model.  Drawing on the work of Pierre Bourdieu, Brisset also uses the notion of Speech Act to study economic models and their use in political power relations. 

MacKenzie's approach was also criticized by Uskali Maki for not using the concept of performativity in accordance with Austin's formulation. This point gave rise to a debate in economic philosophy.

Management studies 
In management, the concept of performativity has also been mobilized, relying on its diverse conceptualizations (Austin, Barad, Barnes, Butler, Callon, Derrida, Lyotard, etc.).

In the study of management theories, performativity shows how actors use theories, how they produce effects on organizational practices and how these effects shape these practices.

For instance, by building on Michel Callon's perspective, the concept of performativity has been mobilized to show how the concept of Blue Ocean Strategy transformed organizational practices.

Journalism 

The German news anchorman Hanns Joachim Friedrichs once argued that a good journalist should never act in collusion with anything, not even with a good thing. In the evening of November 9, 1989, the evening of the fall of the Berlin Wall, however, Friedrichs reportedly broke his own rule when he announced: "The gates of the wall are wide open." („Die Tore in der Mauer stehen weit offen.”) In reality, the gates were still closed. According to a historian, it was this announcement that encouraged thousands of East Berliners to march towards the wall, finally forcing the border guards to open the gates. In the sense of performativity, Friedrichs's words became a reality.

Video art

Theories of performativity have extended across multiple disciplines and discussions. Notably, interdisciplinary theorist José Esteban Muñoz has related video to theories of performativity. Specifically, Muñoz looks at the 1996 documentary by Susana Aiken and Carlos Aparicio, "The Transformation."

Although historically and theoretically related to performance art, video art is not an immediate performance; it is mediated, iterative and citational. In this way, video art raises questions of performativity. Additionally, video art frequently puts bodies and display, complicating borders, surfaces, embodiment, and boundaries and so indexing performativity.

References

Further reading

Austin, J. L. 1962. How to Do Things with Words. Oxford: Clarendon Press.
Austin, J. L. 1970. "Performative Utterances." In Austin, "Philosophical Papers", 233–52. London: Oxford University Press.
Bakhtin, Mikhail. "Discourse in the Novel", The dialogic imagination : four essays; edited by Michael Holquist; translated by Caryl Emerson and Michael Holquist Austin: University of Texas Press, c1981. 
Barad, Karen. 2003. "Posthumanist Performativity: Toward and Understanding of How Matter Comes to Matter." Signs: Journal of Women in Culture and Society 28.3: 801–831.
Boldyrev, Ivan and Svetlova, Ekaterina. 2016. Enacting Dismal Science: New Perspectives on the Performativity of Economics. Basingstoke: Palgrave Macmillan.
Brickell, Chris. 2005. "Masculinities, Performativity, and Subversion: A Sociological Reappraisal." Men and Masculinities 8.1: 24–43.
Brisset, Nicolas.  2017. "On performativity: Option Theory and the Resistance of Financial Phenomena". Journal of the History of Economic Thought. 39(4) : 549–569. DOI: https://doi.org/10.1017/S1053837217000128 
Brisset, Nicolas. 2019. Economics and Performativity. Exploring limits,Theories and Cases. Routledge INEM Advances in Economic Methodology.
Butler, Judith. 1993. Bodies that Matter. On the Discursive Limits of Sex. London and New York: Routledge.
Butler, Judith. 1997. Excitable Speech: A Politics of the Performative. London and New York: Routledge.
Butler, Judith. 2000. "Critically Queer", in Identity: A Reader. London: Sage Publications.
Butler, Judith. 2010. "Performative Agency", in Journal of Cultural Economy 3:2, 147–161. .
Callon, Michel. 1998. "Introduction: the Embeddedness of Economic Markets in Economics". In M. Callon (ed.), The Laws of the Markets. Oxford: Blackwell.
Derrida, Jacques. 1971. "Signature, Event, Context", in Limited, inc., Evanston: Northwestern Univ. Press, 1988.
Dunn, R.G. 1997.  "Self, Identity and Difference: Mead and the Poststructuralists." Sociological Quarterly 38.4: 687–705.
Felluga, Dino. "Modules on Butler". Retrieved on 10/30/06 from Modules on Butler II: Performativity.
Felman, Shoshana. 1980/2003. The Scandal of the Speaking Body: Don Juan With J.L. Austin, or Seduction in Two Languages. Translated by Catherine Porter. Stanford: Stanford University Press.
Garfinkel, Harold. 1967. Studies in Ethnomethodology. Englewood Cliffs, NJ: Prentice Hall. 
Goffman, Erving. 1959. The Presentation of Self in Everyday Life. Garden City, NY: Anchor.
Glass, Michael & Rose-Redwood, Reuben. 2014. Performativity, Politics, and the Production of Social Space. New York: Routledge.
Goffman, Erving. 1976. "Gender Display" and "Gender Commercials." Gender Advertisements. New York: Harper and Row. 
Goffman, Erving. 1983. "Frame Analysis of Talk." The Goffman Reader, Lemert and Branaman, eds., Blackwell, 1997.
Green, Adam Isaiah. 2007. "Queer Theory and Sociology: Locating the Subject and the Self in Sexuality Studies." Sociological Theory 25.1: 26–45.
Hall, Stuart. 2000. "Who Needs Identity?" In Identity: A Reader. London: Sage Publications.
Hawkes, David. 2020. The Reign of Anti-logos: Performance in Postmodernity (Palgrave Insights into Apocalypse Economics), London and New York: Palgrave Macmillan. 
Kessler, Suzanne, and Wendy McKenna. 1978. Gender: An Ethnomethodological Approach. Chicago: University of Chicago Press.
  Pdf.
Lloyd, Moya. 1999. "Performativity, Parody, Politics", Theory, Culture & Society, 16(2), 195–213.
Matynia, Elzbieta. 2009. Performative Democracy. Boulder: Paradigm.
Membretti, Andrea. 2009. "Per un uso performativo delle immagini nella ricerca-azione sociale", Lo Squaderno n.12 (http://www.losquaderno.professionaldreamers.net/?p=1101)
McKenzie, Jon. "Perform or Else: From Discipline to Performance." London: Routledge, 2001.
McKenzie, Jon, Heike Roms, and C. J. Wan-ling. Wee. "Contesting Performance: Global Sites of Research." Basingstoke, UK: Palgrave Macmillan, 2010.
Muñoz, Performing Disidentifications. Disidentifications: Queers of Color and the Performance of Politics. 1999. 
Oliver, Kelly. 2003. "What Is Transformative about the Performative? From Repetition to Working Through." In Ann Cahill and Jennifer Hansen, eds., Continental Feminism Reader.
Parker and Sedgwick, Introduction: Performativity and Performance. Performativity and Performance. 1995.
Pickering, Andrew. 1995. The Mangle of Practice: Time, Agency and Science. Chicago: University of Chicago Press.
Robinson, Douglas. 2003. Performative Linguistics: Speaking and Translating as Doing Things With Words. London and New York: Routledge.
Robinson, Douglas. 2006. Introducing Performative Pragmatics. London and New York: Routledge.
Roudavski, Stanislav. 2008. Staging Places as Performances: Creative Strategies for Architecture (PhD, University of Cambridge) 
Rosaldo, Michele. 1980. The things we do with words: Ilongot speech acts and speech act theory in philosophy. Language in Society 11: 203–237.
Searle, John. 1969. "Speech Acts: An Essay in the Philosophy of Language". Cambridge: Cambridge University Press.
Sedgwick, Eve Kosovsky. 2003. Touching Feeling: Affect, Pedagogy, Performativity. Durham, NC: Duke University Press.
West, Candace and Don Zimmerman. 1987. "Doing Gender." Gender and Society 1.2: 121–151.

Feminist philosophy
Feminist terminology
Magical thinking
Pragmatics
Semiotics
Science studies
Science and technology studies
Sociological theories